Moon Valley is located in the southern end of Independence Township in Oakland County, Michigan, United States.  It comprises most of section 32 on the northern base of Waterford Hill.

Formation
Moon Valley was formed during the retreat of the last continental glacier, approximately 14,000 years ago.  As they retreated, the glaciers left behind debris, called moraines, and valleys.  The retreating glaciers also formed numerous lakes.

History
In 1854, Stephen Moon (1823-1909) came to Independence Township, Michigan from Palmyra, New York and was the first to settled in a valley on the northern side of Waterford Hill along the Saginaw Trail (now Dixie Highway).  His tract of land was in section 32 of the township.  There he established a 120-acre stock farm where he raised sheep, hogs, cows and fowl.

Moon's son, Melvin C. Moon (1854-1933), eventually took over ownership of the farm and ran it until 1910. The valley became known as "Moon Valley" and the farm was subdivided and today consists of a residences on Maple Lane and a commercial district along Dixie Highway.

Geography
The Clinton River winds its way around Moon Valley and through Greens Lake, a 117 acres, 55 foot depth lake which borders the western side of the valley.

References

Geography of Oakland County, Michigan
Landforms of Oakland County, Michigan